Lutze is a German surname. Notable people with the surname include:

 Arthur Lutze (1813–1870), German advocate of homeopathy
 Lothar Lutze (1927–2015), German linguist
 Manuela Lutze (born 1974), German sculler
 Thomas Lutze (born 1969), German politician
 Viktor Lutze (1890–1943), German Nazi officer

German-language surnames
Surnames from given names